The 1999 World Men's Curling Championship (branded as 1999 Ford World Men's Curling Championship for sponsorship reasons) was held at Harbour Station in Saint John, New Brunswick from April 3–11, 1999.

Teams

Round-robin standings

Round-robin results

Draw 1

Draw 2

Draw 3

Draw 4

Draw 5

Draw 6

Draw 7

Draw 8

Draw 9

Tiebreakers

Playoffs

Brackets

Final
In the final end, Hammy McMillan made a draw to the 4-foot against two Canadian stones to secure the win.

References
 

World Men's Curling Championship
W
C
Curling competitions in Saint John, New Brunswick
International curling competitions hosted by Canada
April 1999 sports events in Canada